Max et Jérémie (also known as Max and Jeremy) is a 1992 film starring Christopher Lambert and Philippe Noiret.

Plot
Jeremie is a small time crook who blows up places and people for Paris mobsters. He gets his chance to move up in the underworld when he is hired to kill a retired hitman, Max, who knows too much to be left alive. But Jeremie is unable to kill Max who unexpectedly develops a fondness for him.

Cast

 Philippe Noiret as Robert 'Max' Maxendre
 Christopher Lambert as Jeremie Kolachowsky
 Jean-Pierre Marielle as Almeida
 Abdelhak Bouhout as Boy 
 Feodor Chaliapin Jr. as Sam Marberg
 Jean-Pierre Miquel as Maubuisson
 José Quaglio as Eugène Agopian
 Michèle Laroque as Suzanne
 Christophe Odent as Jacky Cohen
 Thierry Gimenez as Richard
 Christine Dejoux as Lisa
 Patrick Aurignac as Éric
 Charles Assas as Nick Costa
 Christophe Maratier as Pascal
 Karin Viard as The girl

References

External links

1990s French-language films
French crime films
1992 films
Films about contract killing
Films based on American novels
1992 crime films
Films directed by Claire Devers
1990s French films